The de Havilland Vampire is a British jet fighter which was developed and manufactured by the de Havilland Aircraft Company. It was the second jet fighter to be operated by the RAF, after the Gloster Meteor, and the first to be powered by a single jet engine.

Development of the Vampire as an experimental aircraft began in 1941 during the Second World War, to exploit the revolutionary innovation of jet propulsion. From the company's design studies, it was decided to use a single-engine, twin-boom aircraft, powered by the Halford H.1 turbojet (later produced as the Goblin). Aside from its propulsion system and twin-boom configuration, it was a relatively conventional aircraft. In May 1944 it was decided to produce the aircraft as an interceptor for the Royal Air Force (RAF). In 1946 the Vampire entered operational service with the RAF, only months after the war had ended.

The Vampire quickly proved to be effective and was adopted as a replacement of wartime piston-engined fighter aircraft. During its early service it accomplished several aviation firsts and achieved various records, such as being the first jet aircraft to cross the Atlantic Ocean. The Vampire remained in front-line RAF service until 1953 when its transfer began to secondary roles such as ground attack and pilot training, for which specialist variants were produced. The RAF retired the Vampire in 1966 when its final role of advanced trainer was filled by the Folland Gnat. The Royal Navy had also adapted the type as the Sea Vampire, a navalised variant suitable for operations from aircraft carriers. It was the service's first jet fighter.

The Vampire was exported to many nations and was operated worldwide in numerous theatres and climates. Several countries used the type in combat including the Suez Crisis, the Malayan Emergency and the Rhodesian Bush War. By the end of production, almost 3,300 Vampires had been manufactured, a quarter of these having been manufactured under licence abroad. de Havilland pursued the further development of the type; major derivatives produced include the DH.115, a specialised dual-seat trainer and the more advanced DH.112 Venom, a refined variant for ground attack and night-fighter operations.

Development

Origins
In January 1941, Sir Henry Tizard made an informal approach to the de Havilland Aircraft Company, suggesting that the company proceed to design a fighter aircraft that would use the revolutionary new jet propulsion technology then under development, along with an appropriate engine to go with it. Although no official specification had been issued, de Havilland proceeded to design a single-engined aircraft that had air-intakes set into the wing roots to feed a centrally mounted engine, which used a centrifugal compressor.

The aero-engine designer Major Frank Halford had been given access to Frank Whittle's pioneering work on gas turbines, which, for the projected jet-powered fighter, Halford decided to proceed with the design of a "straight through" centrifugal engine capable of generating 3,000 lb of thrust, which was considered to be high at the time. Halford's engine emerged as the Halford H.1. By April 1941, design work on the engine had been completed and a prototype H.1 engine performed its first test run one year later.

The low power output of the early jet engines had meant that only twin-engined aircraft designs were considered to be practical; as more powerful jet engines were quickly developed, particularly Halford's H.1 (later known as the de Havilland Goblin), the practicalities of single-engined jet fighter were soon realised. de Havilland was approached to produce an airframe for the H.1 as insurance against Germany using jet bombers against Britain; this was considered more important than de Havilland's suggestion of a high-speed jet bomber. Its first design, the DH.99, was set out in a brochure dated 6 June 1941; it was an all-metal, twin-boom, tricycle undercarriage aircraft armed with four cannon. The use of a twin boom enabled the jet pipe to be kept relatively short, which avoided the power loss that would have occurred if a long pipe was used, as would have been necessary in a conventional fuselage. It also put the tailplane clear of interference from the exhaust. The Ministry of Aircraft Production (MAP) representative expressed doubts regarding the lack of detail, estimations for the aircraft's performance and optimistic structure weight; the project received permission to proceed in July 1941.

The DH.99 design was soon modified to incorporate a combined wood-and-metal construction in light of recommendations from the MAP; the design was thus renumbered to DH.100 by November 1941. The aircraft was considered to be a largely experimental design due to its use of a single engine and some unorthodox features, unlike the Gloster Meteor which had been specified for production early on. In February 1942, the MAP suggested dropping the project for a bomber but de Havilland stated that the twin-boom was, despite Ministry doubts, only an engineering problem to be overcome. On 22 April 1942, the construction of two prototypes (serials LZ548 and LZ551) was authorised by the Ministry while Specification E.6/41 was produced and issued to cover the work. The company proceeded with the detailed design work phase of the DH.100 in early 1942.

Internally designated as the DH.100 and originally named the "Spider Crab", the aircraft was entirely a de Havilland project, being principally worked upon at the company's facility at Hatfield, Hertfordshire. The construction of the aircraft exploited de Havilland's extensive experience in the use of moulded plywood for aircraft construction which had previously been used on the Mosquito, a widely produced fast bomber of the war.

The layout of the DH.100 used a single jet engine installed in an egg-shaped fuselage which was primarily composed of plywood for the forward section and aluminium throughout the aft section. It was furnished with conventional mid-mounted straight wings; air brakes were installed on the wings to slow the aircraft, a feature that had also been incorporated in the Meteor. Armament comprised four 20 mm Hispano Mk V cannon located underneath the nose; from the onset of the design phase, even when the aircraft was officially intended to serve only as an experimental aircraft, the provision for the cannon armament had been included.

On 20 September 1943, the first DH.100 prototype, serial number LZ548/G, conducted its maiden flight from Hatfield Aerodrome; it was piloted by Geoffrey de Havilland Jr., the company's chief test pilot and son of the company's founder. This flight took place only six months after the Meteor had performed its own maiden flight; the first flight had been delayed due to the need to dispatch the only available engine suitable for flight to America to replace one destroyed in ground engine runs in Lockheed's prototype XP-80 jet fighter. Three prototypes, LZ548/G, LZ551/G, and MP838/G were produced in order to support the type's development.
Testing showed the major issue was a problem with directional instability – the aircraft "snaking" – this was corrected by changes to the tail design.

Production and further development
On 13 May 1944, an initial production order for 120 Vampire Mk I aircraft was received and quickly increased to 300 aircraft. The production Vampire Mk I did not fly until April 1945. Owing to the wartime pressures upon de Havilland's production facilities for existing aircraft types, English Electric Aircraft undertook production of the Vampire at their factories at Preston in Lancashire instead; the company would go on to produce the majority of the aircraft. Only about half a dozen production aircraft had been built by the end of the Second World War, although it did not result in the type becoming a victim of the extensive post-war cuts that were soon implemented, which had terminated the production of many aircraft along with development work upon several more.

De Havilland initiated a private venture night fighter, the DH.113 intended for export, fitting a two-seat cockpit closely based on that of the Mosquito night fighter and a lengthened nose that accommodated an AI Mk X radar. An order to supply the Egyptian Air Force was received but this was blocked by the British government as part of an embargo on supplying arms to Egypt. The RAF took over the order and put them into service as an interim measure between the retirement of the de Havilland Mosquito night fighter and the full introduction of the Meteor night fighter. Removal of the radar from the night fighter and fitting of dual controls resulted in a jet trainer model of the aircraft, the DH.115 Vampire which entered British service as the Vampire T.11. This trainer variant was built in large numbers for the RAF and for export.

An alternative powerplant to the de Havilland Goblin soon became available in the form of the Rolls-Royce Nene, another turbojet engine capable of generating similar levels of thrust. The name Vampire II was given to three experimental Nene-powered Vampires, which were used to assess their performance. One of these was evaluated by the RAF before it was decided that the rival Goblin would be adopted for the RAF Vampires instead; another contributed to development work for the Vampires for the Royal Australian Air Force (RAAF).

Although the Nene had a higher thrust than the Goblin, the level flight speed was no greater. To reduce the intake losses caused by having to feed air to the rear face of the impeller of the Nene, two additional intakes were added behind the cockpit; these caused elevator reversal and buffeting, which in turn reduced the Vampire's Mach limit. The Vampires of the RAAF were powered by the Nene engine; these were initially outfitted with dorsal intakes, later moved underneath the fuselage. In 1949, Boulton Paul Aircraft redesigned the wing-root intakes and internal ducting based on the installation of the Nene in the prototype Hawker Sea Hawk. The Mistral, the French name for their models of the Vampire, also used the Nene engine with Boulton Paul intakes.

The Vampire III was the first of several models that sought to address the demands for greater range from the type. Underwing fuel drop-tanks of 100 and 200 gallon capacities were fitted; other modifications included lowering the tailplane and reshaping the vertical surfaces of the tail. The design changes to accommodate the hardpoint-mounted drop-tanks had the benefit of enabling the carriage of various stores and readied the type for ground-attack operations. The wing was considerably modified to improve low altitude performance, the span was reduced by 2 ft with the adoption of square-cut wing tips, the wing skins thickened and the undercarriage modified to withstand the increased weight.

In total 3,268 Vampires were built in 15 versions, including twin-seat night fighters, trainers and carrier-based Sea Vampires. The Vampire was used by 31 air forces. Germany, the Netherlands, Spain and the U.S. were the only major Western powers not to use the aircraft.

Records and achievements

On 8 June 1946, the Vampire was introduced to the British public when Fighter Command's 247 Squadron was given the honour of leading the flypast over London at the Victory Day Celebrations. On 3 December 1945, a Sea Vampire piloted by Captain Eric "Winkle" Brown became the first pure-jet aircraft to land on and take off from an aircraft carrier.

Vampires and Sea Vampires were used in trials from 1947 to 1955 to develop recovery and deck-handling procedures and equipment for the operation of aircraft without an undercarriage from flexible rubber decks on aircraft carriers. Deletion of the undercarriage would reduce the aircraft weight and allow extra fuel to be carried. Despite demonstrating that the technique was feasible, with many landings being made with undercarriage retracted on flexible decks both at RAE Farnborough and on board the carrier HMS Warrior, the proposal was not taken further. Aviation author Geoffrey Cooper quotes author Marriott stating that the rubber deck system "...would have required extensive facilities both aboard ship and at naval air stations to support it. Any gains in aircraft performance were more than cancelled by the complexity and cost of implementation."

On 23 March 1948, John Cunningham, flying a modified Vampire Mk I with extended wing tips and powered by the Ghost engine, achieved a new world altitude record of 59,446 ft (18,119 m).

On 14 July 1948, six Vampire F.3s of No. 54 Squadron RAF became the first jet aircraft to fly across the Atlantic Ocean when they arrived in Goose Bay, Labrador. They went via Stornoway in the Outer Hebrides of Scotland, Keflavík in Iceland and Bluie West 1, Greenland. From Goose Bay airfield they went on to Montreal (c. 3,000 mi/4,830 km) to start the RAF's annual goodwill tour of Canada and the US, where they gave formation aerobatic displays. At the same time USAF Colonel David C. Schilling led a group of F-80 Shooting Stars flying to Fürstenfeldbruck Air Base in Germany to relieve a unit based there. There were conflicting reports later regarding competition between the RAF and USAF to be the first to fly the Atlantic. One report said the USAF squadron delayed completion of its movement to allow the Vampires to be "the first jets across the Atlantic". Another said that the Vampire pilots celebrated "winning the race against the rival F-80s."

Design

Overview

The de Havilland Vampire was a jet-powered twin-boom aircraft, typically employed in the fighter and fighter bomber roles. Aviation author Francis K Mason referred to it as being "the last unsophisticated single-engine front line aircraft to serve with Britain's Fighter Command"; the Vampire was a relatively straightforward aircraft, employing only manually operated flight controls, no radar, a simple airframe, and, aside from the propulsion system, made use of mostly conventional practices and technologies. The distinctive twin-boom tail configuration of the Vampire was one of the only non-traditional airframe features when compared to its contemporaries.

In comparison to later aircraft, the Vampire had a relatively disorganised cockpit that in some aspects lacked ergonomic measures; such as the fuel gauges being difficult for the pilot to observe without pulling the control column back. A few controls, such as the low-pressure fuel cock, were known for being difficult to move or were otherwise obstructed by other controls. The pilot was provided with a fairly favourable external view, in part aided by the relatively small size of the Vampire.

Engine

The Vampire was first powered by a single Halford H1 (produced as the de Havilland Goblin) turbojet engine, initially capable of producing 2,100 lbf (9.3 kN) of thrust, designed by Frank Halford and manufactured by de Havilland Engine Company. This engine was a centrifugal-flow type, a configuration superseded after 1949 by the slimmer axial-flow units. In 1947, Wing Commander Maurice Smith, assistant editor of Flight magazine, stated upon piloting his first jet-powered aircraft, a Vampire Mk III: "Piloting a jet aircraft has confirmed one opinion I had formed after flying as a passenger in the Lancastrian jet test beds, that few, if any, having flown in a jet-propelled transport, will wish to revert to the noise, vibration and attendant fatigue of an airscrew-propelled piston-engined aircraft".

Initially, the relatively high fuel consumption of the Goblin engine had limited the range of early models of the Vampire; this had been a common problem with all early jet aircraft. As a result, later marks featured considerably increased internal fuel capacity. The H.1 Goblin engine, conceived in 1941, remained unchanged in basic form for 13 years; Flight said "The Goblin ... can fairly claim to be the world's most reliable turbojet". Over successive models, it gained increased turbine temperature and thrust. Later-built Vampire Mk Is were powered by the Goblin II; the F.3 onwards used the improved Goblin III; by the mid-1950s, the Goblin Mk. 35 export engine, capable of 3,500 lbf, had become available as well.

Certain marks of the Vampire were also operated as flying test-beds for the Rolls-Royce Nene engine, leading to the FB30 and 31 variants that were built in, and operated by, Australia. Due to the low positioning of the engine, a Vampire could not remain on idle for long as the heat from the jet exhaust would melt the tarmac behind the aircraft. If the engine did stall in flight, there was no means to re-light the engine, meaning that a forced landing would be necessary.

Handling
According to Mason, the controls of the Vampire were considered to be relatively light and sensitive, employing an effective elevator arrangement that enabled generous acceleration from relatively little control inputs along with highly balanced ailerons that could achieve high rates of roll. In comparison to the elevator and ailerons, the rudder required more vigorous actuation in order to achieve meaningful effect. Pilots converting from piston-engined types would find themselves having to adapt to the slower acceleration of turbojet engines and the corresponding need to moderate rapid throttle movements to avoid instigating a compressor stall.

The Vampire had a relatively good power/weight ratio and was reputedly quite manoeuvrable within the  range. Heavy use of the rudder was required at slower speeds, during which pilots had to be cautious during shallow turns to avoid stalls; this would be typically embarrassing rather than dangerous due to the relative ease of recovery, which was principally achieved via positive elevator application. At speeds in excess Mach 0.71, increasing levels of buffeting were encountered.

The Vampire was compatible with a wide range of aerobatic manoeuvres, Mason comparing its capabilities in this respect to purpose-built sporting aircraft. It has been claimed that the type was the last British jet-powered fighter capable of accurately precipitating conditions such as hammer stalls, stall turns, and wingovers.

Preparing the Vampire for take-off required pilots to perform only six 'vital actions': setting the trim to neutral, opening the high and low-pressure fuel cocks, activating the booster pump, setting the flaps, and retracting the air brakes. If laden with external fuel tanks or bombs, pilots would have to retract the undercarriage quite quickly upon leaving the ground, else increasing airflow as the aircraft picked up speed would prevent the undercarriage doors from closing. Landing procedure was similarly free of complexity: disengaging the wheel brakes, lowering the undercarriage, setting the flaps to fully down, and activating the air brakes. Typically, power-on landings were conducted due to the slow response of the engine to throttle changes, and wheel brakes had to be applied carefully to avoid locking the wheels because there was no anti-lock braking system on the fighters. Training variants had the Dunlop Maxaret anti-skid system fitted.

Operational history

United Kingdom
Royal Air Force

In 1946, the first Vampire Mk I fighters entered RAF service in the interceptor role. Soon thereafter, considerable numbers of Mk I aircraft began equipping RAF squadrons of the Second Tactical Air Force stationed in Germany, often to replace wartime fighters such as the Hawker Typhoon, Hawker Tempest, and North American Mustang. On 3 July 1948, the Vampire became the first jet aircraft to equip peacetime units of the Royal Auxiliary Air Force, gradually replacing the de Havilland Mosquito in this capacity.

On 23 June 1948, the first production Vampire Fighter-Bomber Mk 5 (otherwise commonly designated as the FB.5), which had been modified from a Vampire F.3, carried out its maiden flight. The FB.5 retained the Goblin III engine of the F.3, but featured armour protection around engine systems, wings clipped back by 1 ft (30 cm), and longer-stroke main landing gear to handle greater takeoff weights and provide clearance for stores/weapons load. An external tank or 500 lb (227 kg) bomb could be carried under each wing, and eight "3-inch" rocket projectiles ("RPs") could be stacked in pairs on four attachments inboard of the booms. Although the adoption of an ejection seat was being considered at one stage, it was ultimately not fitted.

At its peak, a total of 19 RAF squadrons flew the Vampire FB.5 in Europe, the Middle East and the Far East. By far, the theatre in which the largest number of Vampires were stationed was Germany; this extensive deployment by the RAF has been viewed as one measure of the emerging Cold War climate between West and East Europe, as well as being a reaction to events such as the Korean War and the Berlin Blockade. Vampires were also operated by a number of active and reserve squadrons stationed in the UK.

A number of RAF Vampires were used in active combat within the Far East during the Malayan Emergency, fought in the late 1940s and early 1950s. Specifically, the Vampire FB.5 typically undertook attack missions using a combination of rockets and bombs against insurgent targets often located in remote jungle areas throughout in Malaysia. The Vampire FB.5 became the most numerous single-seat variant of the type, 473 aircraft having been produced.

Experience of Vampire operation in tropical climates led to the development of new models featuring refrigeration equipment for pilot comfort and increasingly powerful models of the Goblin engine, to counter the degradation of performance in hot conditions. The RAF decided to adopt a new model of the Vampire featuring the Goblin 3 engine. Accordingly, in January 1952, the first Vampire FB.9 was introduced to service and were first used by the Far East Air Force, soon replacing its older FB.5 aircraft. The FB.9 was deployed to various parts of the Middle East and Africa, including a brief 1954 deployment against Mau Mau insurgents in Kenya. It was gradually replaced by the de Havilland Venom, a swept wing development of the Vampire.

The Vampire NF.10 served from 1951 to 1954 with three squadrons (23, 25 and 151) but was often flown in daytime as well as night time. After its replacement by the De Havilland Venom, these aircraft underwent conversion to the NF(T).10 standard, after which they were operated by the Central Navigation and Control School at RAF Shawbury. Other aircraft were sold on to the Indian Air Force for further use.

By 1953, the Vampire FB.5 was being increasingly considered to be obsolete, having not kept up with the advancements made on the Meteor 8. The RAF eventually relegated the single-seat Vampire to advanced training roles in the mid-1950s, and the type had been generally phased out of RAF service by the end of the decade.

The final variants of the Vampire was the T (trainer) aircraft. Being first flown from the old Airspeed Ltd factory at Christchurch, Hampshire, on 15 November 1950, production deliveries of the Vampire trainer began in January 1952. Over 600 examples of the T.11 were produced at Hatfield and Chester and by Fairey Aviation at Manchester Airport. By 1965, the Vampire trainer had been mostly withdrawn, its replacement in the advanced training role being the Folland Gnat; only a small number of Vampire T.11s remained in service, typically for the training of foreign students until these too were retired in 1967.

A small number of aircraft that were used in secondary roles carried on in these capacities until the withdrawal of the last operational aircraft from service with No. 3 Civilian Anti-Aircraft Co-operation Unit at Exeter at the end of 1971. A single aircraft continued to be flown and remained in official service with the RAF as part of the "Vintage Pair" display team (along with a Gloster Meteor); however, this aircraft was lost as a result of a crash in 1986.

Royal Navy

The Admiralty had immediately taken great interest in the Vampire following a series of carrier-landing trials which had been conducted on the aircraft carrier  using the modified third prototype of the Vampire in December 1945. At one point, the service had been allegedly considering the adoption of the type as the standard naval fighter to equip the Fleet Air Arm with; however, according to Mason, there had been a prevailing attitude that carrier operations lacked the flexibility to enable combat operations to be conducted with jet aircraft while at sea due to factors such as jet blast and the limited range of the early jets. In 1947, the Royal Navy decided to place an order for a navalised variant of the Vampire FB.5, which had been separately ordered by Air Ministry; the navalised model was quickly given the name Sea Vampire.

The Sea Vampire had several key differences from their land-based counterparts. It could be easily distinguished by the presence of a V-shaped arrester hook that retracted to a high-mounted position above the jet pipe. The Sea Vampire was fitted with enlarged air brakes and landing flaps for superior low-speed control during landing approaches, along with stronger construction for the higher stresses involved in carrier landings and catapult launches.

On 15 October 1948, the first Sea Vampire performed its maiden flight. A pair of prototypes were followed by 18 production aircraft which were used to gain experience in carrier jet operations before the arrival of the two-seat Sea Vampire T.22 trainers. The Sea Vampire was initially delivered to 700 Naval Air Squadron and 702 Naval Air Squadron, soon replacing their piston-engine powered de Havilland Sea Hornets.

Australia
During 1946, government approval was given for the purchase of an initial 50 Vampire fighter aircraft for the Royal Australian Air Force (RAAF). The first three machines of this batch were British-built aircraft, an F1, F2 and FB.5, and were given serial numbers A78-1 to A78-3. The second aircraft, the F2 (A78-2), was significant in that it was powered by the more powerful Rolls-Royce Nene jet engine, rather than the standard Goblin unit.

All of the 80 F.30 fighters and FB.31 fighter-bomber Vampires that were subsequently built by de Havilland Australia were powered by Commonwealth Aircraft Corporation (CAC) versions of the Nene engine manufactured under licence at their facility in Melbourne. The Nene required a greater intake cross-section than the Goblin, and the initial solution was to mount auxiliary intakes on top of the fuselage behind the canopy. Unfortunately these intakes led to elevator blanking on formation of shock waves, and three aircraft and pilots were lost in unrecoverable dives. All of the Nene-engined aircraft were later modified to move the auxiliary intakes beneath the fuselage, thus entirely avoiding the problem.

In June 1949, the first Vampire F.30 fighter (A79-1) made its first flight; it was followed by 56 more F.30 variants before the final 23 aircraft were completed as FB.31s, being fitted with strengthened and clipped wings along with underwing hardpoints. A single F.30 was also converted to the F.32 standard, which was almost identical to the Vampire FB.9. In 1954, all single seat Vampires were retired by the RAAF, but remained in service in Citizen Air Force squadrons until the early 1960s.

The Vampire T.33 was a two-seat training version, powered by the Goblin turbojet and built in Australia. T.34 and T.35 were used by the RAAF and the Royal Australian Navy (RAN). (In RAAF service they were known as Mk33 through to Mk35W.) Many were manufactured or assembled at de Havilland Australia's facilities in Sydney. The Mk35W was a Mk35 fitted with spare Mk33 wings following overstress or achievement of fatigue life. Vampire trainer production in Australia amounted to 110 aircraft, and the initial order was filled by 35 T.33s for the RAAF; deliveries being made in 1952 with five T.34s for the RAN delivered in 1954. Additional Vampires were imported from Britain during the mid-to-late 1950s. The trainers remained in service in the RAAF until September 1970, and in the RAN until 1971, when they were replaced by the Macchi MB-326.

Canada

In 1946, a single Vampire F.1 began operating on an evaluation basis in Canada at the Winter Experimental Establishment in Edmonton. The Vampire F.3 was selected as one of two types of operational fighters for the Royal Canadian Air Force (RCAF) and was first flown in Canada on 17 January 1948 where it went into service as a Central Flying School training aircraft at RCAF Station Trenton. Operating a total of 86 aircraft, the Vampire F.3 became the first jet fighter to enter RCAF service in any significant numbers.

The Vampire had the function of introducing Canadian fighter pilots not only to jet propulsion, but also to other amenities such as cockpit pressurisation and the tricycle landing gear arrangement. It proved to be a popular aircraft, being easy to fly and often considered a "hot rod." In Canadian service, the Vampire served in both operational and air reserve units (400, 401, 402, 411, 438 and 442 squadrons). For three years from May 2, 1949 to August 22, 1951 the RCAF aerobatic team "The Blue Devils" flew airshows throughout North America In November 1956, the type was retired and was replaced in RCAF service by the Canadair Sabre.

Dominican Republic
The Dominican Air Force purchased 25 of Sweden's Vampires in 1952. Some of these subsequently saw combat in 1959, preventing an attempted amphibious landing by Cuban revolutionaries. They later took part in the 1965 Dominican Civil War.

Egypt
The Egyptian Air Force received its first of a planned 66 Vampire FB52s in December 1950, eventually receiving 50 from de Havilland production. An order for 12 Vampire NF.10 night fighters was cancelled owing to an arms embargo and the aircraft were acquired by the RAF. A factory was built at Helwan to build the Vampire under licence, but political disputes between Egypt and the United Kingdom over the presence of British troops in Egypt led to the project being delayed, before being abandoned following the Egyptian revolution of 1952. Instead, Egypt turned to Italy, and purchased 58 ex-Italian Air Force FB52As, using Syria as an intermediary, with deliveries from 1955 to 1956.

By 1954, Egypt was operating a fleet of 49 Vampires, which had been acquired from both Italy and Britain, in the fighter-bomber role. In 1955, a further 12 Vampire trainers were ordered, deliveries of which started in July that year. On 1 September 1955, in a response to an Israeli commando raid on an Egyptian-held fort at Khan Yunis, four Egyptian Vampires crossed into Israeli airspace, but were intercepted by Israeli Meteor jets, with two Vampires being shot down. By 1956, Egyptian Vampires were in the process of being replaced in the front-line fighter role by the much more capable Mikoyan-Gurevich MiG-15 and MiG-17 swept-wing fighters, and several Vampires were given to Saudi Arabia and Jordan. During the Suez Crisis, the Egyptians mainly used their Vampires for ground-attack missions against the advancing Israeli forces, particularly at the Mitla Pass, and are recorded as having lost a total of four Vampires in combat with Israeli jet aircraft. Several more were destroyed on the ground by Anglo-French air raids.

Finland

The Finnish Air Force received six FB.52 Vampires in 1953. The model was nicknamed "Vamppi" in Finnish service. An additional nine twin-seat T.55s were purchased in 1955. The aircraft were assigned to 2nd Wing at Pori, but were transferred to 1st Wing at Tikkakoski at the end of the 1950s. The last Finnish Vampire was decommissioned in 1965.

France

As part of a larger effort to build up the post-war French Air Force, a number of Goblin-powered Vampire FB.5s were delivered to France from 1949 onwards. This variant of the Vampire was subsequently manufactured under licence by Sud-Est at Marignane, the first 67 aircraft were assembled from British-produced components and were standard aircraft for the most part; these were followed by a further 183 Vampires, which incorporated a greater proportion of French-produced elements. The French developed the FB.53 model, a Nene-powered variant, which was named in French service as the Mistral after the wind of the same name. The Nene engine was alleged to be responsible for the Mistral having greater rate of climb and a higher top speed than the standard Vampire.

A total of 250 Mistrals were built, equipped with Hispano-Suiza built engines, French ejector seats and enlarged wing root ducts. French orders for the type were greatly expanded during the early 1950s as a reaction to the outbreak of the Korean War. Furthermore, the production line was converted for the license-production of the improved de Havilland Sea Venom by the end of 1952 as well. On 2 April 1951, the first Mistral made its maiden flight.

India

On 6 November 1948, the Indian Air Force (IAF) took delivery of its first three de Havilland Vampires at Palam Air Force Station, Delhi; these were procured under a large-scale expansion and modernisation programme. No. 7 Squadron IAF received its first Vampires in January 1949. No. 17 Squadron IAF also operated the type. No. 37 Squadron IAF flew a number of Vampire NF54 night reconnaissance missions over Goa during the 1961 Annexation of Goa from Portuguese rule, sometimes coming under anti-aircraft fire.

On 1 September 1965, during the Indo-Pakistani War, No. 45 Squadron IAF responded to a request for strikes against a counter-attack by the Pakistani Army (Operation Grand Slam), and twelve Vampire Mk 52 fighter-bombers were successful in slowing the Pakistani advance. However, the Vampires encountered two Pakistan Air Force (PAF) F-86 Sabres, armed with air-to-air missiles; in the ensuing dogfight, the outdated Vampires were outclassed. One was shot down by ground fire and another three were shot down by Sabres. The Vampires were withdrawn from front line service after these losses.

Ireland
The Vampire entered service with the Irish Air Corps in 1955, and was the first ever jet powered fighter aircraft in Ireland. A total of six Vampire T.55s were acquired and served under No.1 Fighter Squadron, stationed at Casement Air Base. The Vampires replaced the Supermarine Spitfire and Seafire as Ireland's main combat aircraft. The Vampire brought the jet age to Ireland and introduced heavier armaments through the Vampire's cannons, as well as new technology such as ejection seats. The Vampires served until 1975 and were replaced with six Fouga CM.170 Magisters.

Italy

During the late 1940s, Italy became interested in procuring the Vampire as part of its reequipment programme following the Second World War. The Meteor had also been considered, but was discarded on grounds of cost. At the invitation of Italian Air Force, a series of aerial demonstrations at Italian air shows were performed by British Vampires during September 1949. On 24 October 1949, an agreement was struck with Fiat to license manufacture the type at its plant in Turin; additional work type would also be undertaken by Macchi at Varese; the agreement included five Vampire FB.5, 51 Vampire FB.52, four Vampire NF.10 and ten Vampire NF.54 to be built in the United Kingdom; a total of 150 Vampire FB.52s were also built in Italy under licence.

On 11 March 1950, the first five Vampire FB.5s arrived at the Jet Flight Training School at Foggia. British-built Vampires were delivered in advance of their Italian counterparts as the latter needed more time to establish their production line. During the early 1950s, Italian Vampires were flown by the Cavallino Rampante, the Italian Air Force's first post-war aerial display team. Following Britain's embargo on the sale of military aircraft to Egypt, 58 ex-Italian Air Force Vampires were refurbished and transferred to Egypt during early 1956; Macchi built 45 additional Vampires to replace these in Italian service.

Norway

The Royal Norwegian Air Force (RNoAF) purchased a total of 20 Vampires F.3s, 36 FB.52s and six T.55 trainers. The Vampire was in Norwegian use as a fighter from 1948 to 1957, equipping a three-squadron Vampire wing stationed at Gardermoen. In 1957, the type was withdrawn when the RNoAF decided to re-equip with the Republic F-84G Thunderjet. In 1955, the Vampire trainers were replaced by the Lockheed T-33, these aircraft were returned to the United Kingdom and saw later use by the Royal Air Force.

Rhodesia

The Rhodesian Air Force acquired 16 Vampire FB.9 fighters and a further 16 Vampire T.11 trainers in the early 1950s, its first jet aircraft, equipping two squadrons. These were regularly deployed to Aden between 1957 and 1961, supporting British counter-insurgency operations. 21 more two-seaters and 13 single-seaters were supplied by South Africa in the late 1960s and early 1970s. Rhodesia operated Vampires until the end of the bush war in 1979. In 1977, six were pressed into service for Operation Dingo. They were eventually replaced by the BAE Hawk 60 in the early 1980s. After 30 years service, they were the last Vampires used on operations anywhere.

Sweden

In 1946, the Swedish Air Force purchased its first batch of 70 FB 1 Vampires, having been looking for a jet-powered fighter to replace the outdated J 22 and obsolescenct SAAB 21 aircraft of its fighter force. In Swedish service, the Vampire received the designation J 28A, it was assigned to the Bråvalla Wing (F 13). The type soon provided such good service that the Vampire was soon selected to serve as the backbone of the fighter force. In 1949, a total of 310 of the more modern FB.50s, designated J 28B, which were based on the Vampire FB.5, were procured. The last of these was delivered in 1952, after which all piston-engined fighters were decommissioned. In addition, a total of 57 two-seater DH 115 Vampires, designated J 28C, were also used for training purposes.

In 1956, the Swedish Vampires were retired from the fighter role, to be replaced in service with the J 29 (SAAB Tunnan) and J 34 (Hawker Hunter). In 1968, the final Vampire trainer was retired.

Switzerland

In 1946, the Swiss Air Force purchased an initial four Vampire F.1s, one of which crashed on 2 August 1946 while the other three remained in service until 1961. In 1949, the Swiss government signed a contract to locally manufacture the Vampire FB.6 in Switzerland using British-built Goblin engines; accordingly, a batch of 85 Vampire FB.6s were produced. In 1952, the first production Vampire NF.10 was delivered to Switzerland for evaluation purposes.

In 1949, the first batch of 75 Vampire Mk.6 (J-1005 to J-1079) was purchased. Most of these were phased out of service in 1968/1969, the last aircraft being withdrawn in 1973. A second batch of 100 Vampire Mk.6 (J-1101 to J-1200) were built under licence by a consortium of Swiss aviation companies, including Eidgenössische Flugzeugwerke Emmen, Pilatus Aircraft and Flug- und Fahrzeugwerke Altenrhein. Aircraft from this batch were in use from 1951 to 1974, and were retained in storage until 1988. A further three DH-100 Mk.6 (J-1080 to J-1082) were subsequently built from remaining spare parts. A force of 39 DH-115 Mk 55 Vampire two-seat trainers (U-1201 to U-1239) were also in service from 1953 to 1990. During the late 1950s, Switzerland started procuring Hawker Hunters to replace their Vampire fleet in the fighter role.

Variants

DH.100 Vampire single seat day fighter/fighter-bomber
F.1 (alternatively F.Mk 1 or Mk.1)  single-seat fighter version for the RAF; Three prototypes (named Spider Crab) built for specification E.6/41. 228 production aircraft built, including 70 for Sweden as the J 28A for familiarization. 30 ex-RAF F.1s were transferred to the Armee de l'Air in 1948 for familiarization. TG431 was supplied to Royal Australian Air Force (RAAF) as A78-1 in May 1947 for familiarization. TG278 was modified with extended wings and powered with a Ghost 2.
F.2 Nene-powered prototypes. Two built and three conversions. TX807 was supplied to RAAF as A78-2 in August 1948 for familiarization and technical development.
F.3 single-seat fighter for the RAF. Two prototypes converted from F.1s; 224 were built, 20 were exported to Norway, and 150 to Canada for the Royal Canadian Air Force.
F.4 Nene-powered project, none built.
FB.5 Goblin 2 powered single-seat fighter-bomber with clipped wings; 1123 built, including 930 for the RAF. 94 ex-RAF FB.5s were transferred to the Armee de l'Air in 1949 for operational squadrons. VV465 was supplied to RAAF as A78-3 in May 1949 for familiarization.
FB.6 Goblin 3 powered single-seat fighter-bomber; 175 were built in UK plus 310 built in Sweden as the J 28B and 103 built in Switzerland, including three from spares.
F.8 Ghost-powered F.1 conversion as prototype for de Havilland Venom; One built.
FB.9 tropicalised Goblin-3 powered F.5 fighter-bomber with air conditioning; 348 built, most by de Havilland, and some by Fairey.

Export variants
F.30 Nene-powered single-seat fighter-bomber for the Royal Australian Air Force; 57 built in Australia by the De Havilland Australia (DHA).
FB.31 Nene-powered upgraded F.30, 28 F.30s converted and 23 built new by De Havilland Australia.
F.32 F.30 with air conditioning; One converted in Australia by De Havilland Australia.
FB.50 exports to Sweden as the J 28B; 310 built, 12 later rebuilt as T.55s.
FB.51 exports to France. 67 built from DH-supplied knockdown kits, 20 built in France by Sud-Est.
FB.52 export FB.6, 546 built including 247 by Hindustan Aircraft Limited
FB.52A export FB.6 for Aeronautica Militare Italiana; 51 imported and 150 built in Italy by Macchi and Fiat.
FB.53 export single-seat fighter-bombers as patterns for Armee de l'Air to be built by SNCASE

DH.113 Vampire Night Fighters
NF.10  Goblin-powered two-seat night fighter version for RAF; 81 built including 3 prototypes.
NF.54 export NF.10. Italian Air Force bought 14, and India bought 30 refurbished NF.10s.

DH.115 Vampire Trainers
NF(T).10 navigation trainer based on NF.10; 36 converted
T.11 private venture Goblin 35 powered two-seat trainer; 526 built by de Havilland and Fairey including one prototype. Some had ejection seats.
T.22 T.11 trainer for Royal Navy; 73 built.
T.33 two-seat trainer based in early specification T.11. Powered by the Goblin turbojet; 36 were built in Australia by de Havilland Australia.
T-33A upgraded T.33 to late T.11 specification.
T.34 navalized two-seat T.22 trainer for the Royal Australian Navy; five built in Australia by De Havilland Australia. A sixth was delivered as a T.34A
T.34A T.34 upgraded with ejection seats.
T.35 late T.11 specification two-seat trainers; 68 built in Australia by De Havilland Australia.
T.35A T.35 upgraded from T.33.
T.55 export trainer; 322 built including 30 in Switzerland, 60 in India by HAL and six converted from T.11s.
PR.55 At least 5 T.55s were modified in India for photo reconnaissance.

Sea Vampire
F.1 prototype for deck trials. One conversion from Vampire F.1.
F.20 navalized FB.5; 18 converted by English Electric.
F.21 F.3s with strengthened belly and arrester hook for trials of undercarriage-less landings on flexible decks; two built and/or six converted.
T.22 two-seat trainer for Royal Navy; 73 built by de Havilland.

SNCASE (Sud-Est) Mistral
SE.530 Mistral Hispano-Nene powered prototypes based on FB.53 for French production; 4 built
SE.532 Mistral production version; 93 built.
SE.535 Mistral SE 532 development; 150 built.

Flygvapnet
J 28A Swedish F.1 with wings later clipped similarly to F.5; 70 imported.
J 28B Swedish FB.6, 310 built.
A 28B J 28B/FB.6 relegated to attack role.
J 28C-1 early specification T.55 Vampire Trainer, 30 purchased in 1952. Initially used in a fighter role.
J 28C-2 late specification T.55, 15 purchased in 1955.
J 28C-3 former J 28B single seater fighters converted to T.55A two seater trainers by de Havilland in 1956, 12 converted.

de Havilland Australia
P.17 project trainer with local cockpit alterations.

Paper studies
Mystery Jet Trainer MJT-I demilitarized 2-seat Vampire.
Mystery Jet MJ-II Vampire with lengthened nose with seats for 4 passengers. Fibreglass mockup built from 2-seat Vampire
Whisper Jet proposed widened 6 passenger development.
Executive jet proposed widened 7 passenger twin-engine business jet.
Commuter Jet proposed widened 15 passenger, light airliner similar to the Executive jet.

Operators

 – nicknamed Abu Tiki (roughly, "Daddy of all whistles") due to noise

 -nicknamed Aguacate ("avocado") due to colour and shape.

Surviving aircraft

Examples survive in 28 countries, with airworthy examples in ten.

In the United States, Jerry Conley, owner of Vampire Air Shows, is the only known operator of an airworthy DH-115 Havilland Vampire available for Air Shows and aerobatic demonstrations.

In Canada, Waterloo Warbirds, owns and operates the DH-115 de Havilland Vampire. It is available for passenger rides and airshows.

Specifications (Vampire FB.6)

Notable appearances in media

See also

References

Notes

Citations

Bibliography
 
 
 
 
 .
 
 
 Donnet, Christophe. "A Farewell to Arms". World Air Power Journal. Volume 20, Spring 1995, pp. 138–145. London: Aerospace Publishing. . .
 
 
 
 
 
 
 
 
 
 
 
 Lombardi, Fiona. The Swiss Air Power: Wherefrom? Whereto? Hochschulverlag AG, 2007. .

External links

 Vampire Preservation Group's website
 Restored RNoAF Vampire FB.52 flying
 J 28 de Havilland Vampire Article on the Vampire in Swedish service

Vampire
1940s British fighter aircraft
Carrier-based aircraft
Twin-boom aircraft
World War II jet aircraft of the United Kingdom
Single-engined jet aircraft
Mid-wing aircraft
Aircraft first flown in 1943